Alpa Kalan is a town and Union Council of the Kasur District in the Punjab province of Pakistan. It is part of Pattoki Tehsil and is located at 31°8'16N 73°40'3E with an altitude of 182 metres (600 feet).

References

Kasur District